Delarbrea balansae is a species of flowering plant of family Myodocarpaceae. It is endemic to New Caledonia. It has previously been classified as the sole member of genus Pseudosciadium, but molecular and morphological studies point to its inclusion in the genus Delarbrea.

References

Myodocarpaceae
Vulnerable plants
Endemic flora of New Caledonia
Taxa named by Henri Ernest Baillon
Taxa named by Gregory M. Plunkett